The Eltingville station is an elevated Staten Island Railway station in the neighborhood of Eltingville, Staten Island, New York. It is located at Richmond Avenue on the main line.

History 

The station opened on April 23, 1860, with the opening of the Staten Island Railway from Vanderbilt's Landing to Eltingville. The station was rebuilt in 1939 as part of a grade crossing elimination project.

Station layout
The station contains two side platforms and orange canopies and walls.  It is a transfer point for local buses to the Staten Island Mall, located two miles north of this station, as well as express buses to Manhattan.

Exits

There are staircases at the western end only that lead to Richmond Avenue. The southbound platform contains another exit on the eastern end that leads to Eltingville Boulevard. The station house at Richmond Avenue is at street level and once featured a signal lamp that alerted those waiting that a train was arriving. On the exterior of this station house is a plaque noting the Great Kills to Huguenot grade separation project was done under the auspices of the Public Works Administration.

References

External links

Staten Island Railway station list
Staten Island Railway general information
 Richmond Avenue entrance from Google Maps Street View
 Eltingville Avenue entrance from Google Maps Street View
 Platforms from Google Maps Street View

Staten Island Railway stations
Works Progress Administration in New York (state)
Railway stations in the United States opened in 1860
1860 establishments in New York (state)
Eltingville, Staten Island